Bobby Vinton's All-Time Greatest Hits is a two-LP collection of previously recorded songs by Bobby Vinton, released in 1972 by Epic Records. It reached #119 on the Billboard Hot 200 list of popular albums. It consists completely of singles by Vinton that were released by Epic.

Track listing

Charts
Album - Billboard (North America)

References                 

1972 greatest hits albums
Bobby Vinton compilation albums
Epic Records compilation albums